Avonside is an eastern suburb in Christchurch, New Zealand.  It is one of the oldest suburbs of the city, with only Heathcote being older.

History

The suburb was named after Holy Trinity Avonside, which was built beside the Avon River in 1855. The 1874 part of the church was designed by the eminent architect Benjamin Mountfort who is buried in the churchyard.  The church was damaged in the 2010 Canterbury earthquake and whilst under repair, was damaged beyond repair in the February 2011 Christchurch earthquake and demolished later that year. Avonside is home to Avonside Girls' High School. It also has the Avon River flowing through it. 

The boundaries of the original Anglican parish of Avonside were fixed in 1859 and covered much of what is now suburbs such as Aranui, Burwood, Linwood, Marshland, New Brighton, North New Brighton, Parklands and part of Phillipstown. The area once covered the whole of north east Christchurch as far as the River Styx. 

The area borders the Avon River and is built on the rich soils of the Avon River flood plain.  In the early years of Christchurch the area was known to be extremely swampy and difficult to travel across.

Earthquakes

During the 4 September 2010 Canterbury earthquake, Avonside suffered a large amount of liquefaction. In particular Keller Street, Bracken Street, Retreat Road and Cowlishaw Street were left with large areas covered in water and grey silt. Avonside Drive also experienced a great deal of damage with cracked roads and buildings. Power and water were lost, in some cases for several days, and there was extensive damage to the sewer system.
 
The more devastating 22 February 2011 Christchurch earthquake further damaged infrastructure and houses in the suburb. Liquefaction and flooding was more prominent than in September, along with the damage to roads, and many houses were more severely damaged along with the land they were built on. Power was lost for two to three weeks for many residents and for most houses the sewer infrastructure needed to be replaced or repaired. The New Zealand Army and many other volunteer organisations based in Christchurch (especially the Student Volunteer Army and the Farmy Army) helped residents remove silt from their sections because of the sheer volume, with many streets having large mounds piled up on the side of the road. Local electorate MP Brendon Burns, in association with local community leaders, hosted meetings at Retreat Park (a local park on the corner of Retreat Road and Patten Street) to inform residents of necessary information such as the provision of water and progress of power being re-connected.

Another aftershock struck in June causing liquefaction and flooding along with damaging houses and the infrastructure of the suburb even more. Later in the month the New Zealand Government announced (along with other suburbs in Christchurch) that many homes in Avonside were part of the so-called Red Zone and would be demolished due to the land being too badly damaged to rebuild or repair a house in the near future. Many streets were affected by this decision and residents had until April 2013 to vacate their homes and accept compensation deals that are being offered by both the government and insurance companies for land and house. Other areas of the suburb were placed in the city's Green Zone where insurance companies could begin repair or rebuild of damaged properties. Many sections and houses in the suburb (mainly on Patten Street, Retreat Road and Cowlishaw Street) remained in limbo while the New Zealand government decided whether their land could be remediated or not. This was referred to as the Orange Zone. These decisions have since been made.

Demographics

Avonside had a population of 1,671 at the 2018 New Zealand census, a decrease of 24 people (-1.4%) since the 2013 census, and a decrease of 228 people (-12.0%) since the 2006 census. There were 678 households. There were 837 males and 834 females, giving a sex ratio of 1.0 males per female. The median age was 36.5 years (compared with 37.4 years nationally), with 318 people (19.0%) aged under 15 years, 354 (21.2%) aged 15 to 29, 801 (47.9%) aged 30 to 64, and 195 (11.7%) aged 65 or older.

Ethnicities were 77.4% European/Pākehā, 19.4% Māori, 8.1% Pacific peoples, 7.0% Asian, and 3.1% other ethnicities (totals add to more than 100% since people could identify with multiple ethnicities).

The proportion of people born overseas was 18.0%, compared with 27.1% nationally.

Although some people objected to giving their religion, 52.2% had no religion, 33.0% were Christian, 0.9% were Hindu, 1.4% were Muslim, 0.5% were Buddhist and 2.5% had other religions.

Of those at least 15 years old, 165 (12.2%) people had a bachelor or higher degree, and 315 (23.3%) people had no formal qualifications. The median income was $23,600, compared with $31,800 nationally. The employment status of those at least 15 was that 612 (45.2%) people were employed full-time, 162 (12.0%) were part-time, and 87 (6.4%) were unemployed.

Education
Avonside Girls' High School opened in Avonside in 1919, but the site suffered earthquake damage in 2011. The school moved to North New Brighton in 2019.

References

External links 
Avonside with Wards Malthouse and Brewery at the left, Christchurch (photo circa 1863)
Avonside Parish Church
Avonside Girls' High School
Statistics New Zealand Suburb Profile

Suburbs of Christchurch